James Haworth (1896 – 16 December 1976) was a British Labour politician.

He was a railwayman living in Oswaldtwistle, Lancashire, and active in the Railway Clerks Association. Refused recognition as a conscientious objector in the First World War, he was in Preston Prison (along with Sydney Silverman), and then went to Princetown Work Centre in the erstwhile Dartmoor Prison.

In the 1945 general election he was elected Member of Parliament for Liverpool Walton.

Haworth failed to return to the House of Commons, standing unsuccessfully for Liverpool Walton in the 1950 general election. He was defeated again standing for Chelmsford in the 1951 general election, and for Bolton West in the 1955 general election.

References 
Peace News, 26 May 1939, p 7
Emrys Hughes: Sydney Silverman, Rebel in Parliament, 1969

1896 births
1976 deaths
British conscientious objectors
Labour Party (UK) MPs for English constituencies
UK MPs 1945–1950
Members of the Parliament of the United Kingdom for Liverpool constituencies
Presidents of the Transport Salaried Staffs' Association
Transport Salaried Staffs' Association-sponsored MPs